The Battle of Ustechko (October 6, 1694) was fought during the Polish–Ottoman War (1683–1699), between the armies of the Polish–Lithuanian Commonwealth on the one hand and of Khanate of Crimea and Ottoman Empire on the other. Polish–Lithuanian Commonwealth forces under the command of Stanisław Jan Jabłonowski defeated the Tatars and Ottomans forces commanded by Şehbaz Giray.

References
 Marek Wagner, Stanisław Jabłonowski - kasztelan krakowski, hetman wielki koronny, Mada Wydawnictwo, Warszawa 2000, 

Ustechko 1694
Ustechko 1694
Ustechko
1694 in Europe
Polish–Ottoman wars
Ustechko